I'd Climb the Highest Mountain is a 1951 Technicolor religious drama film made by Twentieth Century-Fox Film Corporation. It was directed by Henry King and produced by Lamar Trotti from a screenplay by King and Trotti. The story is based on a 1910 novel by Corra Harris about a minister and his wife in southern Appalachia (specifically Mossy Creek, Georgia) in the early 20th century. The music score was by Sol Kaplan and the cinematography by Edward Cronjager.

The film stars Susan Hayward and William Lundigan with Rory Calhoun, Barbara Bates, Gene Lockhart, Alexander Knox and Lynn Bari.

The movie was shot in Dawsonville, Georgia in the Appalachian Mountains, an unusual and out-of-the-way location at the time. Other scenes were shot in Sautee-Nacoochee, Georgia , Demorest, Georgia, and Cleveland, Georgia. On June 1st, 1950, Hayward nearly lost her life when she slipped near a waterfall she was photographing. Luckily, William Gray, a studio chauffeur, caught her and they escaped with only minor injuries. (Hayward would later move to another part of rural Georgia a few years later, settling down to farm and ranch with her second husband when she was not making films. The couple are buried near the town of Carrollton, Georgia.)

Plot summary

William Thompson (William Lundigan) is a minister from the Deep South who has recently married Mary Elizabeth (Susan Hayward), a woman from the city. William is assigned a new parish and moves with his wife to a town in Georgia's Blue Ridge Mountains, where he tends to the spiritual and emotional needs of his small flock. The poverty and isolation of the region, and the everyday problems of local people, put a strain on the couple's faith and marriage.

The townspeople have doubts about the new minister he must contend with, as well as helping his city-bred wife adjust to life in the country. As he shepherds his flock through hardships, including an epidemic leading to some deaths, he proves his worth as a pastor.

Cast
 Susan Hayward as Mary Elizabeth Eden Thompson
 William Lundigan as Rev. William Asbury Thompson
 Rory Calhoun as Jack Stark
 Barbara Bates as Jenny Brock
 Gene Lockhart as Jeff Brock
 Lynn Bari as Mrs. Billywith
 Ruth Donnelly as Glory White
 Kathleen Lockhart as Mrs. Brock
 Alexander Knox as Tom Salter

References

External links
 
 
 
 

1951 films
1951 drama films
Films directed by Henry King
Films shot in Georgia (U.S. state)
Films set in Georgia (U.S. state)
Films set in the 1910s
Films set in the 1920s
Films set in the 1930s
Films set in the 1940s
Films based on American novels
Films with screenplays by Lamar Trotti
20th Century Fox films
American drama films
Films scored by Sol Kaplan
1950s English-language films
1950s American films